Castanet (Spanish:Castañuela) is a 1945 Spanish drama film directed by Ramón Torrado.

Cast
 Ricardo Acero
 Anita Bass 
 Victoria Cabo 
 Consuelo Companys 
 Julio Rey de las Heras
 Miguel del Castillo 
 Félix Fernández 
 Fernando Freyre de Andrade 
 Ramón Giner 
 César Guzmán 
 Juana Mansó
 Laura Montesol
 Conchita Sarabia 
 Gracia de Triana

References

Bibliography 
  Eva Woods Peiró. White Gypsies: Race and Stardom in Spanish Musical Films. U of Minnesota Press, 2012.

External links 
 

1945 films
1940s Spanish-language films
Films directed by Ramón Torrado
Suevia Films films
Spanish drama films
1945 drama films
Spanish black-and-white films
1940s Spanish films